Diànjí (店集) may refer to the following locations in China:

 Dianji, Anhui, town in Woyang County
 Dianji, Shandong, town in Jimo